Andre Anthony Clennon (born 15 August 1989) is a Jamaican international footballer who plays for Humble Lions as a forward.

Career

Club 
Clennon has played club football for Waterhouse, Lam Dong and Arnett Gardens. In September 2015, Clennon joined VPS on loan until the end of the 2015 season.

In January 2018, Clennon signed for Keşla FK on a contract until the end of the 2017–18 season. On 13 June 2018, Clennon a new contract with Keşla until the end of the 2018–19 season.

In August 2019, Clennon returned to Jamaica to play for Humble Lions F.C.

International 
He made one international appearance for Jamaica in 2011.

International career statistics

References

External links

1989 births
Living people
Jamaican footballers
Jamaica international footballers
Waterhouse F.C. players
Lam Dong FC players
Arnett Gardens F.C. players
Vaasan Palloseura players
Shamakhi FK players
Humble Lions F.C. players
National Premier League players
Veikkausliiga players
Azerbaijan Premier League players
2015 CONCACAF Gold Cup players
Association football midfielders
Jamaican expatriate footballers
Jamaican expatriate sportspeople in Vietnam
Expatriate footballers in Vietnam
2009 CONCACAF U-20 Championship players
Jamaican expatriate sportspeople in Finland
Expatriate footballers in Finland
Jamaican expatriate sportspeople in Azerbaijan
Expatriate footballers in Azerbaijan
People from Saint Catherine Parish